Éric Holder (5 April 1960 – 22 January 2019) was a French novelist.

He was awarded several literary prizes, including the Prix littéraire de la vocation (1989), the Prix Fénéon (1989), the Prix Thyde Monnier (1989), the Prix Décembre (1994), the Prix Roger Nimier (1996), and the Prix Service Littéraire (2008). He died on 23 January 2019, aged 58.

Works 
1984: Nouvelles du Nord, 
1985: Manfred ou l'hésitation, Éditions du Seuil
1989: Duo forte, Grasset, 1989 (Prix Fénéon, Prix littéraire de la vocation, Prix Thyde Monnier).
1993: L'Ange de Bénarès, Flammarion
1994: Bruits de cœurs, Les Silènes
1994: La Belle Jardinière, Prix Décembre.
1995: L'Homme de chevet, Flammarion
1995: La Tolérance, illustrations by Jean-Marie Queneau, éditions de la Goulotte
1996: Deux Poèmes, illustrations by Jean-Marie Queneau, Claude Stassart-Springer, éditions de la Goulotte
1996: En compagnie des femmes, Le Dilettante (Prix Roger-Nimier)
1996: Mademoiselle Chambon, Flammarion
1997: Jours en douce, Flohic éditions
1997: On dirait une actrice, Librio
1998: Nouvelles du Nord et d'ailleurs , Le Dilettante
1998: Bienvenue parmi nous, Flammarion
2000: Les Cabanes, illustrations by Claude Stassart-Springer, éditions de la Goulotte
2000: Awélé, illustrations by Claude Stassart-Springer, éditions de la Goulotte
2000: La Correspondante, Flammarion
2001: Masculins singuliers
2002: Hongroise, Flammarion
2003: L'Histoire de Chirac, Flammarion 
2005: Les Sentiers délicats, Le Dilettante
2007: La Baïne, Le Seuil
2008: De loin on dirait une île, Le Dilettante, (Prix Service Littéraire).
2009: .
2011: Embrasez-moi, Le Dilettante
2012: L'alphabet des oiseaux, illustrations de Nathalie Azémar, éditions Delphine Montalant
2015: La saison des bijoux, Le Seuil

Prefaces, postfaces 
1998: Gilles Tordjman, C'est déjà tout de suite, Céra-nrs éditions
2002: Michel Laclos, Mots croisés, Zulma
2009: Jean-Paul and Michel Mazot, Chirac en Gévaudan, Atlantica
2010: François de Cornière, Ces moments-là, Castor Astral

References

External links 
 Eric Holder, l’écrivain discret on Save my Brain
 Eric Holder : un grand écrivain dans le Médoc on Le Journal des propriétaires du Médoc
 Eric Holder, Girondin fragile on L'Express
 Rentrée littéraire : Eric Holder fait son marché à la Pointe du Médoc on Mediapart
  La saison des bijoux de Eric Holder on Éditions du Seuil

1960 births
2019 deaths
20th-century French non-fiction writers
21st-century French non-fiction writers
Prix Décembre winners
Prix Fénéon winners
Roger Nimier Prize winners
Writers from Lille